This is a list of Azerbaijan football transfers in the winter transfer window 2016 by club. Only clubs of the 2015–16 Azerbaijan Premier League are included.

Azerbaijan Premier League 2015-16

AZAL

In:

Out:

Gabala

In:

 

Out:

Inter Baku

In:

Out:

Kapaz

In:

Out:

Khazar Lankaran

In:

Out:

Neftchi Baku

In:

Out:

Qarabağ

In:

Out:

Ravan Baku

In:

Out:

Sumgayit

In:

Out:

Zira 

In:

 

Out:

References

Azerbaijan
Azerbaijani football transfer lists